The Wireless Africa programme is a special initiative of the Meraka Institute managed by the CSIR in South Africa.

The Wireless Africa group is researching ways and means to develop sustainable information and communications technology in developing countries. This will be achieved through community-owned decentralized mesh networks built on open source technology.

Vision 
"Make a significant contribution to connecting 450 million people sustainably in rural Africa through wireless mesh and other technology with a community grown philosophy."

Core members

Competency Area Manager:
Kobus Roux

Research Leader:
David Johnson

Implementation Project Manager:
Karel Matthee

Development Coordinator:
Henk Kotze

Partners

Wireless Africa is partnering with Champaign-Urbana Community Wireless Network (CUWiN) in developing appropriate technologies to build affordable community wireless networks.

See also
 South African wireless community networks: Meraka Institute

External links
 Wireless Africa
 First Mile First Inch
 Meraka Institute
 CSIR

Wireless network organizations